Constantine IV was Eastern Roman Emperor from 668 to 685.

Constantine IV may also refer to:
 Constantine IV of Constantinople
 Constantine IV, King of Armenia
 Constantine IV, Prince of Mukhrani